August 8 - Eastern Orthodox liturgical calendar - August 10

All fixed commemorations below are observed on August 22 by Eastern Orthodox Churches on the Old Calendar.

For August 9, Orthodox Churches on the Old Calendar commemorate the Saints listed on July 27.

Feasts

 Afterfeast of the Transfiguration of Our Lord, God, and Savior Jesus Christ.

Saints

 Holy Apostle Matthias (1st century)
 Martyr Anthony of Alexandria (2nd century)
 Venerable Psoes of Egypt (Psoy) (4th century)
 The Holy Ten Martyrs of Halki, who defended the wonderworking icon of the Savior, made of copper:
 Martyrs Julian, Marcian, John, James (Jacob), Alexius, Demetrius, Photius, Peter, Leontius, Mary the Patrician, and others, of Constantinople (730)

Pre-Schism Western saints

 Saints Secundian, Marcellian and Verian, martyrs who suffered near Civitavecchia in Italy under Decius (250) 
 Saint Numidicus and Companions, a group of martyrs burnt at the stake at Carthage in North Africa under Decius (251) 
 Saint Romanus Ostiarius, an early martyr in Rome (258)  (see also: August 10)
 Saints Firmus and Rusticus, two relatives, probably citizens of Bergamo in the north of Italy, honoured in Verona under Maximian (c. 290)
 Saint Amor (Amour), venerated in Franche-Comté in France together with St Viator.
 Saint Domitian of Châlons, third Bishop of Châlons-sur-Marne in France, Confessor (4th century) 
 Saint Rusticus, a martyr at Sirmium in Pannonia (4th century)
 Saint Autor (Adinctor, Auteur), the thirteenth Bishop of Metz in France (5th century) 
 Saint Bandaridus (Banderik, Bandery), Bishop of Soissons in France from 540 to 566 and founder of a monastery at Crépin (566) 
 Saint Phelim, a disciple of St Columba (6th century) 
 Saint Serenus, Bishop of Marseilles in France (606)
 Saint Nathy (Nath Í of Achonry, David), disciple of St Finian of Clonard (c. 610)

Post-Schism Orthodox saints

 Saint Macarius, founder of Oredezh Monastery (Novgorod) (1532)
 Saint Philaret (Gumilevsky), Archbishop of Chernigov (1866)
 Saint Alexis Medvedkov, Archpriest, of Ugine, France (1934)  (see also: August 2)

New martyrs and confessors

 New Martyr Abbess Margaret (Gunaronulo) of Menzelino (1918)  (see also: January 25 / February 7)
 Holy New Martyr Ignatius (Bazyluk), at St Onuphrios Monastery in Jabłeczna (1942)  (see also: July 28)

Other commemorations

 Icon of the Savior "Not-Made-by-Hands" of Camuliana in Cappadocia (Image of Camuliana), an acheiropoieton (ca. 303)
 The Restoration of the Temple of the 40 Martyrs of Sebaste, in Constantinople.
 Repose of Irene of Athens, Byzantine empress regnant and a strong iconodule (803)
 Synaxis of the Saints of Solovki.
 Canonization of Venerable Herman of Alaska, Wonderworker of America.

Icon gallery

Notes

References

Sources
 August 9 / August 22. Orthodox Calendar (PRAVOSLAVIE.RU).
 August 22 / August 9. HOLY TRINITY RUSSIAN ORTHODOX CHURCH (A parish of the Patriarchate of Moscow).
 August 9. OCA - The Lives of the Saints.
 The Autonomous Orthodox Metropolia of Western Europe and the Americas (ROCOR). St. Hilarion Calendar of Saints for the year of our Lord 2004. St. Hilarion Press (Austin, TX). p. 58.
 Menologion: The Ninth Day of the Month of August. Orthodoxy in China.
 August 9. Latin Saints of the Orthodox Patriarchate of Rome.
 The Roman Martyrology. Transl. by the Archbishop of Baltimore. Last Edition, According to the Copy Printed at Rome in 1914. Revised Edition, with the Imprimatur of His Eminence Cardinal Gibbons. Baltimore: John Murphy Company, 1916. pp. 237–238.
 Rev. Richard Stanton. A Menology of England and Wales, or, Brief Memorials of the Ancient British and English Saints Arranged According to the Calendar, Together with the Martyrs of the 16th and 17th Centuries. London: Burns & Oates, 1892. pp. 387–388.

 Greek Sources
 Great Synaxaristes:  9 ΑΥΓΟΥΣΤΟΥ. ΜΕΓΑΣ ΣΥΝΑΞΑΡΙΣΤΗΣ.
  Συναξαριστής. 9 Αυγούστου. ECCLESIA.GR. (H ΕΚΚΛΗΣΙΑ ΤΗΣ ΕΛΛΑΔΟΣ).

 Russian Sources
  22 августа (9 августа). Православная Энциклопедия под редакцией Патриарха Московского и всея Руси Кирилла (электронная версия). (Orthodox Encyclopedia - Pravenc.ru).

August in the Eastern Orthodox calendar